John Adam Kulbitski (November 11, 1917 – June 20, 2000) was an American football player and coach. He served as the head football coach at Western Washington University from 1956 to 1959 and at Bemidji State University in 1961, compiling a career college football coaching record of 18–22. Kulbitski played college football at the University of Minnesota from 1936 to 1938.  He was the brother of National Football League (NFL) player Vic Kulbitski.

Head coaching record

References

External links
 

1917 births
2000 deaths
Bemidji State Beavers football coaches
Minnesota Golden Gophers football coaches
Minnesota Golden Gophers football players
Western Washington Vikings football coaches